Group 13 hydrides are chemical compounds containing group 13-hydrogen bonds (elements of group 13: boron, aluminium, gallium, indium, thallium).

Trihydrides
The simplest series has the chemical formula XH3, with X representing any of the boron family.

The great variety of boranes show a huge covalent cluster chemistry, but the heavier group 13 hydrides do not. Despite their formulae, however, they tend to form polymers. Alane(aluminum trihydride) is a strong reducing agent with octahedrally coordinated aluminium atoms. Gallane is even harder to synthesise and decomposes to gallium and hydrogen at room temperature. Indigane and thallane are too unstable to exist for any significant time when not coordinated.

Simple MH3 group 13 hydrides have a trigonal planar molecular geometry. This is due to the sp2 hybridized center and vacant p-orbital, and contrasts with the trigonal pyramidal geometry of the pnictogen hydrides which are sp3 hybridized and contain a non-bonding lone pair of electrons.

All group 13 hydrides have their hydrogen anions such as BH4− and AlH4−.

Hexahydride

References

Hydrides